The governor of North Carolina has a duty to enforce state laws and to convene the legislature. The governor may grant pardons except in cases of impeachment. For about 220 years the governor had no power to veto bills passed by the North Carolina General Assembly, but a referendum in November 1996 altered the state's constitution, so that North Carolina ceased to be the only state whose governor lacked that power.

There have been three Presidents and 69 governors of North Carolina, with six governors (Richard Caswell, Alexander Martin, Benjamin Williams, Zebulon Baird Vance, William Woods Holden, and Jim Hunt) serving non-consecutive terms, totaling 78 terms in both offices.  The current governor is Democrat Roy Cooper, who took office on January 1, 2017.

Presidents of the Provincial Council 
North Carolina was one of the original thirteen colonies, and was admitted as a state on November 21, 1789 . Prior to declaring its independence, North Carolina was a colony of the Kingdom of Great Britain. The 13-member Provincial Council, renamed the Council of Safety in April 1776, was essentially the executive authority during the second year of the Revolution, and was appointed by the Provincial Congress. The Presidency of the Council and the Presidency of the Congress could each be considered the highest offices in the state during this time, but the council was supreme when the congress was not in session.

List of presidents 
Terms and backgrounds of the three men who served as president of the Provincial Council:

Governors from 1776 to 1836

Governors were elected to one-year terms by the state legislature. Governors that serve non-consecutive terms are counted twice.

Governors from 1837 to present

See also 
List of colonial governors of North Carolina
List of governors of North Carolina (1712–1776)

Notes

References

External links 

Official
 
 General information
 
 Governors of North Carolina at The Political Graveyard
 History of NC Gubernatorial Races at OurCampaigns.com
 
 

List
Governors
Lists of state governors of the United States
governors